Uri Nissan Gnessin (1879–1913) was a Russian-Jewish writer and a pioneer in modern Hebrew literature.

Early life
He was born in Starodub, and grew up in the small town of Pochep, Orel province. His father was a rabbi and the head of a yeshiva in Pochep. His brother was Menahem Gnessin, a co-founder of the Habima Theatre.
After attending cheder, Gnessin studied at his father's yeshiva, and there became friends with Yosef Haim Brenner, a fellow student. As a boy he wrote poetry and was interested secular subjects; when he was 15 years old, he and Brenner together produced a literary journal that they distributed to a small circle of friends.

Literary career and later years
Around 1899, when Gnessin was 18 years old, he was invited by Nahum Sokolow to join the editorial board of the Hebrew-language newspaper Ha-Tsefirah, in Warsaw, where he began to publish his poems and stories, as well as literary criticism and translations. His first book, Zilelei ha-Hayyim (The Shadows of Life), a collection of stories and sketches, was published in 1904.

In 1906, he co-founded the Hebrew-language publishing house "Nisyonot" (Attempts), and after moving to London in 1907, he co-edited (with Brenner) Ha'Meorer, a Hebrew periodical.

In the fall of 1907, he immigrated to Palestine; however, his experience there disappointed him, and in 1908 he returned to Russia. In 1913, he died in Warsaw of a heart attack.

Gnessin wrote in a unique style of prose that was notable for its expressionistic language form. Many Israeli literary scholars, such as Dan Miron and Gershon Shaked have written of his work, especially about the short story "BaGanim" (At the Gardens).

Published works
Collected Works (two volumes), Tel-Aviv: Hakibbutz Hameuchad and Zemorah-Bitan, 1982 [Hebrew]
Beside & Other Stories, with an introduction by Rachel Albeck-Gidron, New Milford: Toby Press, c2005.

References

External links 
 Complete collection of his works, both poetry and prose (Project Ben Yehuda) (in Hebrew)
 

1879 births
1913 deaths
People from Starodub
People from Chernigov Governorate
Russian Jews
Jewish writers
Hebrew-language writers
Writers from the Russian Empire
Jews from the Russian Empire
Date of birth missing
Date of death missing